Bernardo L. Sabatini is an American neuroscientist who is the Alice and Rodman W. Moorhead III Professor of Neurobiology at Harvard Medical School.

Education and academic career
Sabatini received his S.B. in biomedical engineering from Harvard College. He received his PhD in neurobiology and his MD from Harvard Medical School, having attended the joint MD–PhD program co-administered by Harvard and the Massachusetts Institute of Technology. After graduation he began as a postdoctoral fellow with Karel Svoboda, then at Cold Spring Harbor Laboratory.

In 2001, Sabatini established his own research group in the Department of Neurobiology at Harvard Medical School. He was named a Howard Hughes Medical Institute Investigator in 2008. He is also an investigator with the Simons Foundation's Collaboration on the Global Brain. He was elected to the American Academy of Arts and Sciences in 2014 and the National Academy of Sciences in 2019.

Research
Sabatini's research group studies the biophysics of synapses and synaptic plasticity, and the connection between properties of neurons and their networks to animal behavior and disease. The group has developed methods and technologies to support this work and is well known in particular for advances in two-photon microscopy and more recently, super-resolution microscopy. He is one of six co-founders of the Italy-based biotechnology company OptogeniX, which sells equipment for optogenetics studies.

Personal life
Sabatini is the son of Argentine immigrants David D. Sabatini, a cell biologist at New York University, and Zulema Sabatini, a doctor. Bernardo Sabatini's older brother David M. Sabatini is also an M.D.-Ph.D. and was a professor at the Massachusetts Institute of Technology until he resigned in 2022.

External links
 Science Matters with Bernardo Sabatini - brief video talk

References

American neuroscientists
Harvard Medical School alumni
Harvard Medical School faculty
Fellows of the American Academy of Arts and Sciences
Living people
Harvard School of Engineering and Applied Sciences alumni
Harvard College alumni
Year of birth missing (living people)
Members of the United States National Academy of Sciences